The year 1994 in architecture involved some significant architectural events and new buildings.

Events
 The Maupoleum in Amsterdam is demolished.

Buildings and structures

Buildings opened
 May 6 – The Channel Tunnel connecting Britain and France is opened.
 September 4 – Kansai International Airport in Osaka, Japan, designed by Renzo Piano, opens with its Terminal 1 as the longest building in the world.
 date unknown – Channel 4 Building, home of the Channel 4 television company, designed by the Richard Rogers Partnership, opened on Horseferry Road in Westminster, London.

Buildings completed

 Oriental Pearl Tower, Shanghai, China.
 Shinjuku Park Tower, in the Shinjuku district of Tokyo, Japan.
 Kamiichi Mountain Pavilion, Japan, designed by Peter Salter.
 World Trade Center México, Mexico City, Mexico.
 Qingdao TV Tower, Qingdao, China.
 International Saddam Tower, Baghdad, Iraq.
 Igualada Cemetery, Catalonia, designed by Enric Miralles and Carme Pinós.
 Pirkkala Church, Finland, designed by Käpy and Simo Paavilainen.
 Hauer-King House, Canonbury, London, designed by Future Systems.
 Manggha, Cracow, Poland, by Arata Isozaki.

Awards
 AIA Gold Medal – Norman Foster.
 Architecture Firm Award – Bohlin Cywinski Jackson.
 European Union Prize for Contemporary Architecture (Mies van der Rohe Prize) – Nicholas Grimshaw & Partners for Waterloo International railway station, London.
 Praemium Imperiale Architecture Laureate – Charles Correa.
 Pritzker Prize – Christian de Portzamparc.
 Prix de l'Équerre d'Argent – Henri Gaudin|Henri and Bruno Gaudin.
 RAIA Gold Medal – Neville Quarry.
 RIBA Royal Gold Medal – Michael and Patricia Hopkins.
 Thomas Jefferson Medal in Architecture – Frank O. Gehry.
 Twenty-five Year Award – Haystack Mountain School of Crafts

Deaths
 February 14 – Pietro Belluschi, Italian-born American architect (born 1899)
 August 11 – Gordon Cullen, English architect and urban designer associated with the "Townscape" movement (born 1914)
 August 19 – Nancy Lancaster, American-born interior decorator associated with the English country house look (born 1897)
 October 24 – John Lautner, American architect (born 1911)
 November 11 – Stephen Dykes Bower, English ecclesiastical architect (born 1903)
 December 10 – Henry Bernard, French architect, designer of the Palace of Europe (born 1912)

References

 
20th-century architecture